The forward rate is the future yield on a bond. It is calculated using the yield curve. For example, the yield on a three-month Treasury bill six months from now is a forward rate.

Forward rate calculation

To extract the forward rate, we need the zero-coupon yield curve. 

We are trying to find the future interest rate  for time period ,  and  expressed in years, given the rate  for time period  and rate  for time period . To do this, we use the property that the proceeds from investing at rate  for time period  and then reinvesting those proceeds at rate  for time period  is equal to the proceeds from investing at rate  for time period .

 depends on the rate calculation mode (simple, yearly compounded or continuously compounded), which yields three different results.

Mathematically it reads as follows:

Simple rate

 
 		 		
Solving for  yields:

Thus 
 	
The discount factor formula for period (0, t)  expressed in years, and rate  for this period being 	
,
the forward rate can be expressed in terms of discount factors:

Yearly compounded rate

 

Solving for  yields :

 

The discount factor formula for period (0,t)  expressed in years, and rate  for this period being
, the forward rate can be expressed in terms of discount factors:

Continuously compounded rate

Solving for  yields:

STEP 1→   

STEP 2→   

STEP 3→   

STEP 4→   

STEP 5→   

The discount factor formula for period (0,t)  expressed in years, and rate  for this period being
,
the forward rate can be expressed in terms of discount factors: 

 

 is the forward rate between time  and time , 

 is the zero-coupon yield for the time period , (k = 1,2).

Related instruments 
 Forward rate agreement
 Floating rate note

See also 
Forward price
Spot rate

References 

Financial economics
Swaps (finance)
Fixed income analysis
Interest rates